Dame Brenda Mary King, Mrs Sullivan  (born 13 June 1964, Belfast) is the Attorney General for Northern Ireland. Prior to her appointment in 2020, Ms King was First Legislative Counsel in Executive Office, leading the specialist office responsible for the drafting of Northern Ireland Assembly Bills.

She is the second, and second successive holder of the office not to be a politician sitting in either the Parliament of Northern Ireland, at Stormont, or the UK Parliament and the first to be appointed directly from the Civil Service.

Early life
Brenda King attended Assumption Grammar School in Ballynahinch, County Down.

Career
Educated at Queen's University of Belfast and graduating in law in 1986, with further education at the University of South Carolina and Cambridge University, Ms King started her career in private practice as a solicitor, qualified in both Northern Ireland and the Republic of Ireland, before she moved into the civil service, becoming the Executive's chief legislative adviser in 2012. She had previously spent time as a diplomat – including a period in Gibraltar – dealing principally with EU and public international law.

She is a former president of the Commonwealth Association of Legislative Counsel (2017–19), which involved working with lawyers in 92 jurisdictions to improve the quality of legislation in Commonwealth jurisdictions broadly sharing similar common law traditions of lawmaking.

Appointment

King was appointed Attorney General, initially on an interim basis, to succeed John Larkin QC, who stepped down in June 2020 after serving in the post for 10 years. She was sworn in August 2020 at the Royal Courts of Justice in Belfast, formally taking office as chief legal adviser to the Stormont Executive at a ceremony overseen by Lord Chief Justice Sir Declan Morgan.

King was appointed Dame Commander of the Order of the Bath (DCB) in the 2021 Birthday Honours for services to constitutional law.

References

Living people
1964 births
Alumni of Queen's University Belfast
Attorneys General for Northern Ireland
Dames Commander of the Order of the Bath